Culan is a commune in the Cher département in the Centre-Val de Loire region of France.

It is best known for its 12th-15th century medieval castle, the Château de Culan, one of the oldest castles still occupied in the world. The castle has beautiful medieval gardens and it is open to visitors every day from Easter until November.

Geography

Population

Sights
 The church of St. Vincent, dating from the seventeenth century
 The castle
 A watermill
 A nineteenth-century viaduct

See also
Château de Culan
Communes of the Cher department

References

External links

Website of the Château de Culan 

Communes of Cher (department)
Berry, France